The naval Battle of Solebay took place on 28 May Old Style, 7 June New Style 1672 and was the first naval battle of the Third Anglo-Dutch War.

The battle began as an attempted raid on Solebay port where an English fleet was anchored and largely unprepared for battle, and ended at a hard-fought draw. The battle however prevented a planned allied naval invasion of the Dutch Republic and boosted the morale of the Dutch population. Both sides claimed victory.

The battle

A fleet of 75 wars ships, 20,738 men and 4,484 cannon of the United Provinces, commanded by Lieutenant-Admirals Michiel de Ruyter, Adriaen Banckert and Willem Joseph van Ghent, surprised a joint Anglo-French fleet of 85-95 war ships (depending on source), 34,496 men and 6,018 cannon at anchor in Solebay (nowadays just Southwold bay), at Southwold in Suffolk, on the east coast of England. The Dutch had the weather gauge until their withdrawal.

The Duke of York and Vice-Admiral Comte Jean II d'Estrées planned to blockade the Dutch in their home ports and deny the North Sea to Dutch shipping. The Dutch had hoped to repeat the success of the Raid on the Medway and a frigate squadron under Van Ghent sailed up the Thames in May but discovered that Sheerness Fort was now too well prepared to pass. The Dutch main fleet came too late, mainly due to coordination problems between the five Dutch admiralties, to prevent a joining of the English and French fleets. It followed the Allied fleet to the north, which, unaware of this, put in at Solebay to refit. On 7 June the Allies were caught by surprise and got into disarray when the Dutch fleet, having the weather gauge, suddenly appeared on the horizon in the early morning. The French fleet, whether through accident or design, steered south followed by Banckert's fifteen ships and limited its action to long-distance fire. Nevertheless, the Superbe was heavily damaged and des Rabesnières killed by fire from Enno Doedes Star's Groningen; total French casualties were about 450.

This left the Dutch vanguard and centre to fight it out with the English, and the latter were hard pressed, as they had great difficulty to beat upwind to bring ships out. The Duke of York had to move his flag twice, finally to London, as his flagships Prince and St Michael were taken out of action. The Prince was crippled by De Ruyter's flagship De Zeven Provinciën in a two hours' duel. De Ruyter was accompanied by the representative of the States-General of the Netherlands, Cornelis de Witt (the brother of Grand Pensionary Johan de Witt) who bravely remained seated on the main deck, although half of his guard of honour standing next to him was killed or wounded.

Lieutenant-Admiral Aert Jansse van Nes on the Eendracht first duelled Vice-Admiral Edward Spragge on HMS London and then was attacked by HMS Royal Katherine. The latter ship was then so heavily damaged that Captain John Chichely struck her flag and was taken prisoner; the Dutch prize crew however got drunk on the brandy found and allowed the ship to be later recaptured by the English.

The flagship of Admiral Edward Montagu, 1st Earl of Sandwich, HMS Royal James, was first fiercely engaged by Lieutenant-Admiral Van Ghent, who in 1667 had executed the Raid on the Medway, on Dolfijn. Van Ghent was however killed by shrapnel. Then captain Jan van Brakel made his Groot Hollandia attack to the Royal James, incessantly pounding the hull of that ship for over an hour and bringing her into such a condition that Lord Sandwich considered to strike his flag but decided against it because it was beneath his honour to surrender to a mere captain of low birth. He then ordered sloops from other ships to board the Groot Hollandia; his upper deck soon swarming with Englishmen Van Brakel was forced to cut the lines and retreat between friendly vessels to drive the boarding teams off. The Royal James now drifted away, sinking, and was attacked by several fire ships. She sank two, but a third, Vrede, commanded by Jan Daniëlszoon van den Rijn, its approach shielded by Vice-Admiral Isaac Sweers's Oliphant, set her on fire. She burnt with great loss of life; Sandwich himself and his son-in-law Philip Carteret drowned trying to escape when his sloop collapsed under the weight of panicked sailors jumping in; his body washed ashore, only recognisable by the scorched clothing still showing the shield of the Order of the Garter.

During the battle the wind shifted, giving the English the weather gauge, and in the late afternoon the Dutch withdrew.

Losses were heavy on both sides: one Dutch ship, the Jozua, was destroyed and another, the Stavoren, captured, a third Dutch ship had an accident during repairs immediately after the battle and blew up. The battle ended inconclusively at sunset.

In a strategic sense, it can be seen as a Dutch victory as it deterred Anglo-French plans to blockade Dutch ports and land troops on the Dutch coast. Tactically both sides sustained heavy damages; two English ships were sunk, including the fleets flagship the Royal James, as well as two French ships sunk. The Dutch also lost two large ships, in addition to many fire ships.

The fleets met again at the Battle of Schooneveld in 1673.

Ship list
Not all fireships are listed; there were about 24 of them on the Allied, 36 on the Dutch side.

England and France (The Duke of York and Albany)

The Netherlands (Michiel de Ruyter)

In popular culture
 The battle is described in verse, as if in an eyewitness account seen from the coast at Dunwich, in the ballad "A Merry Song on the Duke's late glorious Success over the Dutch", which appears in print (apparently taken from a broadside ballad) in the Suffolk Garland of 1818.
 Leeds Central Library has a 50ft (15m), step by step, pictorial record of the sea battle which dates from around 1910. It is based on contemporary parchments and also features scenes depicting the Battle of Texel. It forms part of the Gascoigne collection.
 The battle is described in the novel "An Affair of Dishonour" published in 1910 by William de Morgan who was also an artist in glass and ceramics.  A wounded survivor becomes an important character in the story.
 The Battle of Solebay forms the historic background to children's adventure novel The Lion of Sole Bay, the fourth book in the Strong Winds series by Julia Jones
 The Adnams Brewery created a beer, named Broadside, in commemoration of the battle's tercentenary.

In his novel, “The Black Tulip”, Alexandre Dumas refers to the historical role of Cornelius de Witt in the battle. (Chapter 2, “The Two Brothers”)

See also
 Seven ships of the Royal Navy have been named HMS Solebay after this battle.

References

External links
 The Battle of Solebay at ship-wrecks.co.uk
 Lynn, John A., The Wars of Louis XIV: 1667-1714 (Longman Publishing: Harlow, England, 1999).

Solebay
Solebay
Solebay
1672 in England
17th century in Suffolk
Naval battles involving the Dutch Republic
Naval battles involving England
Naval battles involving France
Naval battles of the Franco-Dutch War
James II of England